Hiboun, Mahdia is a town and commune in the Mahdia Governorate, Tunisia, located in Sahel, Tunisia region  south of Monastir and southeast of Sousse in tourist area and contain many hotels and nightclubs and universities.
As of 2009 it had a population of 23,241.

See also
List of cities in Tunisia

References

Populated places in Mahdia Governorate
Communes of Tunisia
Tunisia geography articles needing translation from French Wikipedia